The Diocese of Cava (de' Tirreni) was a Roman Catholic diocese located in the Italian region Campania. It existed from 1394 to 1986, and was informally known as  Cava and Sarno (Cava e Sarno) from 27 June 1818 to 25 September 1972 while in union (aeque principaliter) with the neighboring Diocese of Sarno.

History 
The Diocese of Cava was established on 7 August 1394 (centered on the monastery of La Trinità della Cava), on territory split off from the Metropolitan Archdiocese of Salerno.  To ease the transition, the Abbot of Cava, Liguori Majorini, was named Archbishop of Salerno, and in the vacancy the first bishop, Francesco d'Aiello, was appointed.  The abbey church became the Cathedral of the diocese, and monks of the abbey formed the Cathedral Chapter, whose head was the Prior.

In 1513 the diocese lost territory to establish the Territorial Abbacy of Santissima Trinità di Cava de’ Tirreni.

On 27 June 1818 the diocese of Diocese of Nocera de’ Pagani (Nuceria Paganorum) was permanently suppressed and its territory was assigned to the diocese of Cava de'Tirreni. At the same time Pope Pius VII reduced the cathedral of Sarno to the rank of co-cathedral, and united the diocese of Sarno with that of Cava, the result to be known as Diocese of Cava and Sarno.<ref>Catholic Encyclopedia, "Abbey of Trinita di Cava Dei Tirreni" (1913). ...eamdem episcopali ecclesiae Cavensi in perpetuum seque principaliter similiter unimus...</ref>

On 7 December 1833, in the Bull In vinea Domini, Pope Gregory XVI restored the diocese of Nocera de’ Pagani, and assigned it the territory which it had lost fifteen years earlier to the diocese of Cava. On 21 September 1850  the diocese of Cava lost territory to establish the Diocese of Diano–Teggiano.

In 1972 its personal union with Sarno was ended.

In 1986 the diocese of Cava was suppressed and its territories divided. Cava de Tirreni merged with the Metropolitan Archdiocese of Amalfi as Roman Catholic Archdiocese of Amalfi-Cava de' Tirreni, while the territory of the former diocese of Sarno merged with the restored diocese of Nuceria Paganorum to form the diocese of Nocera Inferiore-Sarno.

 Bishops 
(all Roman rite)

Bishops of Cava

from 1394 to 1550

 Francesco de Aiello (1394 – 1407.12)
 Francesco Mormile (1408–1419)
 Sagace dei Conti (1419–1426)
 :it:Angelotto Fosco (1426.05.22 – 1431) and Administrator (1431–1444)
Ludovico Scarampi-Mezzarota Trevisano (1444.09.03 – 1465.03.22) Apostolic Administrator
 Giovanni d'Aragona (1465 – 1485.10.17) Apostolic Administrator
 Oliviero Carafa (1485 – 1497.04.15) Apostolic Administrator
 Arsenio da Terracina (1497–1498)
 Paolo da Milano first time (1498–1499 see below)
 Giustino da Taderico-Harbès first time (1499–1501 see below)
 Vincenzo De Riso (1501–1503)
 Giustino da Taderico-Harbès second time (see above 1503–1504)
 Michele Tarsia (1504–1506)
 Benedetto da Vicenza (1506–1507)
 Paolo da Milano second time (see above 1507–1511)
 Luigi d'Aragona (1511 – 5 May 1514 Resigned) Apostolic Administrator
 Pietro de Sanfelice (5 May 1514 – 1520)
 Joannes Thomas Sanfelice (14 March 1520 – 1550)

from 1550 to 1818

 Thomas Caselius, O.P. (3 October 1550 – 1572)
 Cesare de Alamaña y Cardoña (della Magna) (2 June 1572 – 1606)
 Cesare Lippi, O.F.M.Conv. (11 December 1606 – May 1622).
 Matteo Granito (26 October 1622 – 17 September 1635)
 Gerolamo Lanfranchi (12 January 1637 – 1660?)
 Luigi di Gennaro (5 April 1660 – 1670
 Gaetano d'Afflitto, O.Theat. (30 June 1670 – April 1682)
 Giovanni Battista Giberti (15 February 1683 – 17 December 1696)
 Giuseppe Maria Pignatelli, O.Theat. (17 December 1696 – March 1703)
 Marino Carmignano (17 December 1703 – December 1729)
 Domenico Maria de'Liguori, O.Theat. (8 February 1730 – May 1751)
 Nicolaus Borgia (5 July 1751 – 27 March 1765)
 Pietro di Gennaro (5 August 1765 – 17 May 1778)
 Michael Tafuri (1 June 1778 – c. 1803)Sede vacante (c. 1803 – 1818)

Bishops of Cava (and Sarno)

Silvestro Granito, 1818–1832
Tommaso Bellacosa, 1834–1843
Salvatore Fertitta, 1844–1873
Giuseppe Carrano, 1874–1890
Giuseppe Izzo, 1890–1914
Luigi Lavitrano, 1914–1924
Pasquale Dell'Isola, 1928–1938
Francesco Marchesani, 1939
Gennaro Fenizia, 1948–1952
Alfredo Vozzi, 1953–1972

Bishops of Cava de’ Tirreni
Jolando Nuzzi, 1972–1986
Ferdinando Palatucci, 1982–198630 September 1986: the diocese was divided into its historical territories with the former Diocese of Cava united with the Archdiocese of Amalfi to form the Archdiocese of Amalfi-Cava de' Tirreni; and the former Diocese of Sarno united with the Diocese of Nocera de' Pagani to form the Diocese of Nocera Inferiore-Sarno Notes 

Books
Reference Works
 (in Latin)
 (in Latin)

 pp. 875. (Use with caution; obsolete)
 (in Latin)
 (in Latin)
 (in Latin)

Studies

Buchicchio, Massimo (2011). Reverendissimi in Christo Patres et Domini Cardinali commendatari de la abbazia de la Sanctissima Trinità et Episcopi de la città de La Cava. Cava de' Tirreni 2011.

Kehr, Paulus Fridolin (1935). Italia pontificia. Regesta pontificum Romanorum.'' Vol. VIII: Regnum Normannorum — Campania .  Berlin: Weidmann.

External links 
 GCatholic with incumbent bio links

Former Roman Catholic dioceses in Italy